The Yele language, or , is the language of Rossel Island, the easternmost island in the Louisiade Archipelago off the eastern tip of Papua New Guinea. There were some 4,000 speakers in 1998, comprising the entire ethnic population. The language remains unclassified by linguists.

Classification
For now, the language is best considered unclassified. It has been classified as a tentative language isolate that may turn out to be related to the Anêm and Ata language isolates of New Britain (in a tentative Yele – West New Britain family). Typologically it is more similar to the Oceanic languages of southern New Guinea than to the isolates of New Britain. Word order tends to be subject–object–verb (SOV; verb-final).

Stebbins et al. (2018) classifies Yélî Dnye as an isolate. They explain similarities with Austronesian as being due to contact and diffusion.

Phonology
Yele has a uniquely rich set of doubly articulated consonants. In nearly all the languages of the world which have them, these are labial–velar consonants—that is, they are pronounced simultaneously with the lips and the back of the tongue, such as a simultaneous p and k. Only Yele is known to contrast other doubly articulated positions: besides labial–velar, it has two distinct labial–alveolar positions (laminal/dental and apical/postalveolar), as illustrated below.

The two coronal articulations are (1) laminal/dental and slightly pre-alveolar, sometimes transcribed tʸ, nʸ, etc. (see denti-alveolar consonant), and (2) apical and slightly post-alveolar, sometimes transcribed ṭ, ṇ etc., ʈ, ɳ, etc., or simply t, n, etc.

The Yele w is labial–dental . These doubly articulated consonants contrast with labialization (SIL 1992/2004). Many articulations may also be palatalized. Stops may be either pre- or (except perhaps for ) post-nasalized. The consonant inventory includes the following:

It is not clear how many of the labial–velar and labial–alveolar consonants such as  may also be labialized or palatalized. Nor is it clear how many of these articulations occur prenasalized or with nasal release, but besides those noted above, the following are noted in SIL 1992/2004: .

The oral stops  (that is, apart from dental ) are voiced between vowels and when prenasalized. The (post-)alveolar is further reduced to an (apparently dental) flap  between vowels.

Yele also has many vowels, a noteworthy number of which are nasalized: 

(The distinction between open-mid and close-mid nasal vowels is rather unusual, and SIL (1992/2004) provides no examples of the close-mid vowels.

Vowels may occur long or short. SIL (1992/2004) interprets other vowel sequences as being separated by  rather than as diphthongs.

Orthography

The multigraphs for complex consonants are not always transparent. The labial-velar and labial-alveolar consonants are written with the labial second: kp, dp, tp, ngm, nm, ńm, lv. Prenasalized stops are written with an m when labial, including doubly articulated stops, as with md  or mg , and with n otherwise. Nasal release is likewise written n or m, as in dny , kn , dm , km .

Of the vowels, only a and u occur initially. Long vowels are written doubled, and nasal vowels with a preceding colon (:a for ), except for short vowels after a nasal consonant (or a nasal release?), where vowel nasality is not contrastive.

Grammar
Yele has been studied extensively by cognitive linguists. It has an extensive set of spatial postpositions. Yele has eleven postpositions equivalent to English on; using different ones depending factors such as whether the object is on a table (horizontal), a wall (vertical), or atop a peak; whether or not it is attached to the surface; and whether it is solid or granular (distributed).

Pronouns
Yele has a set of free pronouns and a set of bound possessive pronouns.

{| class="wikitable"
! colspan="2" rowspan="2" |
! colspan="2" |Singular
! colspan="2" |Dual
! colspan="2" |Plural
|-
!English
!Yele
!English
!Yele
!English
!Yele
|-
! rowspan="2" |1st person
!free
| rowspan="2" |       I ||  || rowspan="2" |  we two ||  || rowspan="2" |     we || 
|-
!bound
|
|
|
|-
! rowspan="2" |2nd person
!free
| rowspan="2" |   thou ||  || rowspan="2" | you two ||  || rowspan="2" |    you || 
|-
!bound
|
|
|
|-
! rowspan="2" |3rd person
!free
| rowspan="2" |  he/she || – || rowspan="2" |they two 
| rowspan="2" |–|| rowspan="2" |   they ||
|-
!bound
|
|
|}

Taboos and special registers
There are three different types of taboos present in Yélî Dnye: vocabulary avoided by women, vocabulary avoided when in the presence of in-laws and vocabulary related to sacred places. However, since the language has fallen into disuse, many of these language changes are no longer used.

Additionally, special registers and terms are used when discussing shell money, at a mortuary feast and during songs.

Women's language
As a form of women's speech, women avoid certain words, especially those related to the sea. Instead, other words are substituted.

In-laws
Since great respect is shown to in-laws on Rossel Island, speakers of Yélî Dnye will not say their in-laws' names, will only speak of each in-law using the polite third-person plural pronoun , and will replace certain words when speaking near them. While the alternative vocabulary is mostly no longer used, the name and pronoun taboos are still observed. 

Most of the taboo words are body parts, clothing or carried possessions. Not all body words are replaced, however: for example, 'neck', 'Adam's apple' and 'stomach' retain their everyday forms.

Vocabulary
Selected basic vocabulary items in Yélî Dnye:

{| class="wikitable sortable"
! gloss !! Yélî Dnye
|-
| bird || ; 
|-
| blood || 
|-
| bone || 
|-
| breast || 
|-
| ear || 
|-
| eat || 
|-
| egg || 
|-
| eye || 
|-
| fire || ; 
|-
| give || 
|-
| go || ; ; 
|-
| ground || ; 
|-
| hair || 
|-
| head || 
|-
| leg || 
|-
| louse || 
|-
| man || 
|-
| moon || 
|-
| name || 
|-
| one || 
|-
| road, path || 
|-
| see || 
|-
| sky || ; 
|-
| stone || 
|-
| sun || 
|-
| tongue || 
|-
| tooth || 
|-
| tree || 
|-
| two || 
|-
| water || ; 
|-
| woman || ; 
|}

Sample text
Yélî Dnye:
 

Yélî Dnye in the International Phonetic Alphabet:

 

Translation:

 The savage dog is called "Peetuuki", and he lives at Doongê. It's nothing to do with me. It's not my dog. It's Nkal's dog. He raised it. It's a bad dog. It bites everyone. It doesn't like anyone. Recently it bit Mépé's son, Yidika. It really bit him hard. Mépé became very angry, and said, 'I'm going to kill that dog'. The dog ran away into the bush, so Mépé could not kill it. So now it's still there at Doongê, so there's not a safe road through there. That's the end of my story.
(SIL 1992/2004)

References

Bibliography
 James E. Henderson, 1995. Phonology and grammar of Yele, Papua New Guinea. Pacific Linguistics B-112. Canberra: Pacific Linguistics.
Peter Ladefoged & Ian Maddieson, 1996. The sounds of the world’s languages. Oxford: Blackwells. 
Stephen C. Levinson, 2003. Space in Language and Cognition: Explorations in Cognitive Diversity. Cambridge University Press. 
 Phonology sketch from SIL, 1992/2004

External links 
 
 Paradisec has multiple collections with Yele materials, including two collections of Arthur Cappell's materials (AC1, AC2).
 The World Atlas of Language Structures lists 44 typological features of "Yelî Dnye" based on from James Henderson's 1975 and 1995 grammars of the language. https://wals.info/languoid/lect/wals_code_yel

Yele–West New Britain languages
Language isolates of New Guinea
Languages of Milne Bay Province
Nuclear Papuan Tip languages